Mispila coomani may refer to either of two beetle species in the genus Mispila, in different subgenera:

 Mispila (Dryusa) coomani
 Mispila (Mispila) coomani